The Södermanland Runic Inscription 16  is a Viking Age runestone engraved in Old Norse with the Younger Futhark runic alphabet. It is in sandstone and located in the cemetery of Kattnäs Church in Gnesta Municipality.

Inscription
Transliteration of the runes into Latin characters

 §A  · þ(i)... ...uþin · hhn · unʀ · tauþr · i [hailaby] halbi · kuþ · aat ·
 §B aʀ
Old Norse transcription:

 §A 
 §B <aʀ>

English translation:

 §A "... Auðin/Loðin. He died in Hedeby. May God help (his) spirit."
 §B "<aʀ>"

References

Runestones in Södermanland